Applied Psychological Measurement is a peer-reviewed academic journal published by SAGE Publications. The journal covers research on methodologies and research on the application of psychological measurement in psychology and related disciplines, as well as reviews of books and computer programs. The journal's editor-in-chief is Hua-Hua Chang (University of Illinois Urbana-Champaign). Applied Psychological Measurement was featured in ScienceWatch in May 2011, as the number of citations to the journal place it among highly cited journals in the fields of psychiatry and psychology.

Abstracting and indexing 
Applied Psychological Measurement is abstracted and indexed in Scopus and the Social Sciences Citation Index. According to the Journal Citation Reports, its 2021 impact factor is 1.522, ranking it 9th out of 13 journals in the category "Psychology, Mathematical" 38th out of 53 in the category "Social Sciences, Mathematical Models".

References

External links
 

SAGE Publishing academic journals
Publications established in 1977
Applied psychology journals
English-language journals
Psychometrics journals
Psychological methodology
8 times per year journals